Abney is an unincorporated community in Raleigh County, West Virginia, United States. Abney was once known as Phillips.

References

External links 
Coalfields of the Appalachian Mountains - Abney, WV
Road to Abney WV - Abney, WV

Unincorporated communities in Raleigh County, West Virginia
Unincorporated communities in West Virginia
Coal towns in West Virginia